The Muddy Mountains are a large mountain range in Clark County, Nevada.

The Muddy Mountains surround a north section of Bitter Spring Valley, which also lies at the northwest perimeter of the Black Mountains, lying on a north shore of an east-west section of Lake Mead.

The Muddy Mountains Wilderness consists of 48,154 acres and was established by the U.S. Congress in 2002.  The wilderness area is managed by the U.S. Bureau of Land Management and the National Park Service.  Elevations in the area range from 1,700 feet (518 m) to 5,400 feet (1645 m).

References

External links
Muddy Mountains Wilderness - Lake Mead National Recreation Area
Muddy Mountains Herd Management Area - BLM

 
Mountain ranges of Nevada
Mountain ranges of Clark County, Nevada